Isaac Becerra Alguacil (born 18 June 1988) is a Spanish footballer who plays as a goalkeeper for CF Badalona Futur.

He played 180 games in the Segunda División, mostly for Girona but also for Valladolid and Gimnàstic.

Club career

Early years
Born in Badalona, Barcelona, Catalonia, Becerra was on the books of both regional powerhouses FC Barcelona and RCD Espanyol as a youth. He made his senior debut for the latter's reserves in the Segunda División B, playing the two final games of the 2006–07 season, both defeats. The following campaign, he appeared in 12 matches and was sent off once as the team suffered relegation.

After a loan to Panionios F.C. of the Super League Greece, he moved to another B team, Real Madrid Castilla in 2010. He was used rarely during his tenure, winning promotion to Segunda División as champions in his second year.

Girona
On 29 June 2012, Becerra returned to his native region, signing a two-year deal with second level club Girona FC. Despite only playing three times in the league season, he contested all four play-off games, assisting one of Javier Acuña's goals in a 3–1 home win against AD Alcorcón in the second leg of the semi-final.

On 20 February 2014, with his deal due to expire in the summer, Becerra extended his stay at the Estadi Montilivi for another two years. In 2014–15, he was ever-present as the side came a best-ever third, and both he and teammate Álex Granell were named in the division's Team of the Year at the LFP Awards. In the first leg of the play-offs on 11 June, he kept a clean sheet in a 3–0 away victory over Real Zaragoza, and manager Pablo Machín highlighted him for praise.

Becerra was the Segunda División Player of the Month for April 2016, after conceding one goal in five matches to put Girona one point off the play-offs – by that point, he was an undisputed starter and had kept 15 clean sheets. He was again named the division's Goalkeeper of the Year.

Valladolid
On 23 June 2016, Becerra joined Real Valladolid for three years. He conceded no goals on his debut on 21 August, as his team began the season with a 1–0 home defeat of Real Oviedo.

Becerra was back-up to new signing Jordi Masip the following campaign, playing only cup games and the dying moments of the victorious play-off final against CD Numancia.

Gimnàstic
On 31 July 2018, Becerra signed a three-year deal with Gimnàstic de Tarragona still in the second division. He appeared in roughly the same number of matches as Bernabé Barragán during the season, as the team finished third from the bottom and were relegated; as a result, his contract was automatically terminated due to a clause.

Later career
Becerra joined Córdoba CF on 10 July 2019, on a two-year contract. He was sent off the following 16 February in a 2–1 home victory against Sevilla Atlético, for a foul on José Lara.

After two third-tier campaigns for Córdoba, Becerra returned to his native region on 30 August 2021, signing with Cerdanyola del Vallès FC in the new Segunda División RFEF.

International career
In March 2019, Becerra was chosen for the unofficial Catalonia national team for the first time. He made his debut on 25 March in a 2–1 win over Venezuela at his former club ground in Girona, coming on as a half-time substitute for Édgar Badía.

Honours
Real Madrid Castilla
Segunda División B: 2011–12

Spain U19
UEFA European Under-19 Championship: 2007

Individual
Ricardo Zamora Trophy (Segunda División): 2015–16
Segunda División Team of the Year: 2014–15
Segunda División Player of the Month: April 2016

References

External links

1988 births
Living people
People from Badalona
Sportspeople from the Province of Barcelona
Spanish footballers
Footballers from Catalonia
Association football goalkeepers
Segunda División players
Segunda División B players
Tercera División players
Segunda Federación players
CF Damm players
RCD Espanyol B footballers
RCD Espanyol footballers
Real Madrid Castilla footballers
Girona FC players
Real Valladolid players
Gimnàstic de Tarragona footballers
Córdoba CF players
Cerdanyola del Vallès FC players
UE Costa Brava players
Super League Greece players
Panionios F.C. players
Spain youth international footballers
Catalonia international footballers
Spanish expatriate footballers
Expatriate footballers in Greece
Spanish expatriate sportspeople in Greece